The Cameroon olive greenbul (Phyllastrephus poensis), is a species of songbird in the bulbul family, Pycnonotidae.

It is found in the Cameroon line (including Bioko). Its natural habitat is subtropical or tropical moist montane forests. Alternate names for the Cameroon olive greenbul include Bioko greenbul and Cameroon olive bulbul.

References

Phyllastrephus
Cameroon olive greenbul
Birds of the Gulf of Guinea
Birds of Central Africa
Fauna of Cameroon
Cameroon olive greenbul
Taxonomy articles created by Polbot